"Into the Light " is the debut album by Linda Andrews, winner of the second season of the Danish version of the X-Factor. It was released on June 16, 2009.

Track list

References

2009 debut albums
Sony Music Denmark albums